Monti may refer to:


People
 Monti (given name)
 Monti (surname)

Places
Monti, Lazio, the first rione (historic district) of Rome, Italy
Monti, Sardinia, Italy, a comune and town
Monti, Iowa, United States, a town

See also
Monte (disambiguation)
Montie (disambiguation)
Monty (disambiguation)